The 1995 North Texas Mean Green football team represented the University of North Texas in the 1995 NCAA Division I-A football season. The Mean Green played their home games at the Fouts Field in Denton, Texas, and competed as an Independent. They were led by second-year head coach Matt Simon. The team finished the regular season with a 2–9 record.

Return to Division I-A
The 1995 season marked the return of Division I-A football to Denton for the first time since 1982. North Texas had competed in the Southland Conference in Division I-AA from 1983-1994 after the university's athletic department fell on hard financial times following the departure of head coach and athletic director Hayden Fry to Iowa. The 1995 team was considered a transitional Division I-A member and was thus not eligible for a bowl game, regardless if they met the required six wins or not.

Expanded Fouts Field
As part of a coordinated effort by the athletic department and donors to bring attendance levels up to Division I-A standards, donors and boosters alike bought out large sections of seats at Fouts Field to spike attendance numbers. In addition to this, the university expanded the stadium itself, adding two sections of metal bleachers in the east and west end zones to bring the total capacity of the venue from 20,000 to 30,500. Fouts Field's capacity would remain at 30,500 for the rest of its time as an NCAA football stadium, until both sections of metal bleachers and the north grandstand were demolished in 2013, two years after North Texas moved across I-35E to new Apogee Stadium.

The "Schedule from Hell"
Without any conference games to be tied to and no bowl game in the cards as a transitional Division I-A member, North Texas' athletic department opted to schedule multiple "Guarantee Games" to help improve the department's financial outlook moving forward as a full Division I-A member. The 1995 team thus played only three true home games in Denton. One other "home" game against Kansas, from the Big Eight Conference, was moved to the larger Texas Stadium in nearby Irving to help increase ticket sales with the expected influx of Jayhawks fans. The Mean Green played seven road games in all, with two against other Big Eight schools (Missouri and #10 Oklahoma), two against Southeastern Conference programs (LSU and Alabama), then-independent Louisville, future Big West Conference foe Nevada, and Big West member UNLV, who departed for the Western Athletic Conference in 1996.

The lone reprieve in the scheduling gauntlet was a home game against Oregon State (from the Pacific-10 Conference), the first Division I-A game at Fouts Field since 1983. The Mean Green upset the favored Beavers 30-27, who went on to finish their season 1–10. North Texas' only other win on the year was against Division I-AA member Idaho State.

Schedule

References

North Texas
North Texas Mean Green football seasons
North Texas Mean Green football